Ronny Gómez (born 7 May 1966) is a Costa Rican judoka. He competed in the men's half-heavyweight event at the 1996 Summer Olympics.

References

1966 births
Living people
Costa Rican male judoka
Olympic judoka of Costa Rica
Judoka at the 1996 Summer Olympics
Place of birth missing (living people)
20th-century Costa Rican people